Cireșu is a commune located in Mehedinți County, Oltenia, Romania. It is composed of four villages: Bunoaica, Cireșu, Jupânești and Negrușa.

References

Communes in Mehedinți County
Localities in Oltenia